The 2020 IBSF World Championships were held in Altenberg, Germany from 21 February to 1 March 2020.

This World Championships saw the introduction of a skeleton mixed team event, consisting of one run each of men's and women's skeleton. This was also the first World Championship, since its introduction at the 2007 championships, without the mixed-sleds mixed team event, consisting of one run each of men's skeleton, women's skeleton, 2-man bobsleigh, and 2-women bobsleigh.

Schedule
Six events were held.

All times are local (UTC+1).

Bobsleigh

Skeleton

Medal summary

Medal table

Bobsleigh

Skeleton

References

External links

 
IBSF
2020 in German sport
2020 in bobsleigh
2020 in skeleton
Sport in Altenberg, Saxony
Bobsleigh in Germany
Skeleton in Germany
February 2020 sports events in Germany
March 2020 sports events in Germany